The Apponegansett Meeting House or "Apponagansett Meeting House" is a historic Quaker (Friends) meeting house on Russells Mills Road east of Fresh River Valley Road in Dartmouth, Massachusetts.  Built in 1791, it is the oldest Quaker meeting house in southeastern Massachusetts, and one of its best preserved.  The property it stands on, which includes a cemetery, has been used by its Quaker congregation since at least 1699.  It was added to the National Register of Historic Places in 1991.

Description and history
The Apponegansett Meeting House is set on the south side of Russells Mills Road, just east of Fresh River Valley Road. It is a two-story wood frame structure, with a gable roof, wooden shingle siding, and a rubblestone foundation.

The meeting house was built in 1791, on land that has been used by local Quakers since the 17th century.  Dartmouth was established by Quakers in 1664, including most of what is now Westport, Acushnet, New Bedford, and Fairhaven.  Their first meeting house was built on this property (exact location undetermined) in 1699, and the cemetery is the burial ground for many of Dartmouth's early settlers.  The first meeting house was repeatedly enlarged, until it was decided to build the present structure in 1791.  Despite the decline in local Quaker congregations, the building continues to be maintained by the community, and is used for services in the summer.

Several scenes of Down to the Sea in Ships, a 1922 film, were filmed there.

See also
 National Register of Historic Places listings in Bristol County, Massachusetts

References

External links
 

Churches completed in 1791
18th-century Quaker meeting houses
Churches on the National Register of Historic Places in Massachusetts
Quaker meeting houses in Massachusetts
Cemeteries on the National Register of Historic Places in Massachusetts
Churches in Bristol County, Massachusetts
Cemeteries in Bristol County, Massachusetts
Dartmouth, Massachusetts
National Register of Historic Places in Bristol County, Massachusetts
1791 establishments in Massachusetts
Cemeteries established in the 1790s